Amin Ghasemipour is an Iranian welterweight boxer who was born in Jirandeh., Iran on September 21, 1985. At the 2012 Summer Olympics, he competed in the Men's welterweight.

References

Living people
Olympic boxers of Iran
Boxers at the 2012 Summer Olympics
Welterweight boxers
Boxers at the 2014 Asian Games
Iranian male boxers
Year of birth missing (living people)
Asian Games competitors for Iran
21st-century Iranian people